Splendrillia candidula is a species of sea snail, a marine gastropod mollusk in the family Drilliidae.

Description
The length of the shell attains 11 mm, its diameter 2.5 mm.

(Original description) The small, solid, ice-white shell has a subcylindrical shape and is very glossy. The shell contains 7 whorls, inclusive of the protoconch—a small smooth dome of two whorls. The only spirals on the shell are four lines on the snout. The ribs are broad and low, crowded above, and becoming more spaced as growth proceeds. They become evanescent on the last half whorl, discontinuous from whorl to whorl, amounting to eight on the penultimate, sometimes lightly impressed and sometimes interrupted by the fasciole, which is not otherwise apparent. The suture is sinuate. The aperture is fusiform. The outer lip is expanded and bent inwards, thickened on its outer edge, insinuate at the base. The sinus is deeper than the siphonal canal, with a slightly raised rim, the entrance contracted. On the inner lip is a callus sheet, thickening at the posterior angle to a tubercle. The siphonal canal is a mere notch.

Distribution
This marine species is endemic to Australia and occurs off Queensland.

References

 Brazier, J. 1876. A list of the Pleurotomidae collected during the Chevert Expedition, with the description of the new species. Proceedings of the Linnean Society of New South Wales 1: 151–162
 Wells F.E. (1993) New records of Splendrillia (Gastropoda: Turridae) from northwestern Australia, with the description of a new species. Journal of the Malacological Society of Australia 14: 113–117

External links

candidula
Gastropods of Australia
Gastropods described in 1922